Lower Tully is a rural locality in the Cassowary Coast Region, Queensland, Australia.

Geography 
The Tully River forms the southern boundary of the locality; the river enters the Coral Sea at neighbouring Tully Heads. The central and southern parts of the locality is freehold farming land, predominantly growing sugarcane; there is a cane tramway to deliver the sugarcane to the Tully Sugar Mill at Tully. The northern part of the locality contains the Hull River National Park, taking its name from the  Hull River which flows through the northern part of the locality and then enters the Coral Sea at neighbouring Hull Heads.

History
Lower Tully State School opened on 15 February 1932.

On Sunday 16 June 1935, the  Vicar Apostolic of Cooktown John Heavey laid the foundation stone for a Roman Catholic church to be dedicated to Christ, the King; the building was expected to cost £1250. It is not known when the church opened but it was operational by July 1937. Due to a declining congregation and the ease of attending Catholic services in Tully, the church held its last regular Mass on 2 November 1984, although it was used for occasional baptisms and weddings. The church was sold in 1992 to new owners who make the church available for services by any denomination, renaming it "Chapel of the Pioneers". It is on Tully Hull Road. It is listed on the Cassowary Coast Local Heritage Register.

Education 

Lower Tully State School is a government primary (Prep-6) school for boys and girls at 6 Collins Road. In 2016, the school had an enrolment of 57 students with 6 teachers (4 full-time equivalent) and 7 non-teaching staff (3 full-time equivalent). In 2018, the school had an enrolment of 56 students with 5 teachers (3 full-time equivalent) and 8 non-teaching staff (4 full-time equivalent).

There are no secondary schools in Lower Tully. The nearest government secondary school is Tully State High School in Tully to the north-west.

References

Further reading

External links 

Cassowary Coast Region
Localities in Queensland
Cassowary Coast Local Heritage Places